Cosei Kawa is an illustrator of children's books and an associate professor at Shizuoka University of Art and Culture.

Books 
 Deborah's Tree (Lerner, 2022)
 Asa the Rock Cutter (Collins, 2022)
 Carpe Diem (Fushiana-sha, 2020)
 An Unlikely Ballerina (Kar-Ben, 2018)
 The Tigon and the Liger (Lantana Publishing, 2016)
 Feeding the Flying Fanellis (Carolhroda Books, 2015)
 Two Dragon Tales (HarperCollins, 2015)
 Rifka Takes a Bow (Kar-Ben, 2013)
 How to Persuade a Grumpy Goddess (Pearson, 2013)
 The Three Princes (HarperCollins, 2011)
 Issun Boshi (Franklin Watts, 2010)

Awards 
 Independent Publisher Book Award / A bronze medal (2016)
 Lee Bennett Hopkins Poetry Award / Honor books (2016)
 CCBC (Cooperative Children's Book Center) choice (2014)
 Sydney Taylor Book Award, Honor Book / A silver medal (2014)
 Best Children's Book of the Year by Children's Book Committee at Bank Street College (2014)
 Kirkus Best Children's Books (2013)

References 

Japanese children's book illustrators
21st-century illustrators of fairy tales
Living people
International Christian University alumni
Alumni of Falmouth University
Year of birth missing (living people)